George Anthony Michael (February 16, 1926 – June 5, 2008) was an American computational physicist at Lawrence Livermore Laboratories,
best known for his role in the development of supercomputing. He was one of the founders of the annual ACM/IEEE Supercomputing Conference, first held in 1988. The George Michael
Memorial Fellowship was established in his honor.   George was the person primarily responsible for doing the interviews and gathering the materials for the web site: Stories of the Development of Large Scale Scientific Computing at Lawrence Livermore National Laboratory.

References

1926 births
2008 deaths
20th-century American physicists
American computer scientists
Lawrence Livermore National Laboratory staff
Computational physicists